Ojārs Arvīds Feldbergs is a Latvian sculptor. He founded the Pedvāle Open Air Museum in 1992.

Biography
Ojārs Feldbergs was born in Riga, Latvia.  He graduated from the Department of Sculpture at the Latvian Academy of Fine Arts in 1976.

The Defense of Riga
In January, 1991, four large granite blocks from his studio formed the political artwork "Barricade".  This blocked a street in Old Riga, to prevent entry of Soviet tanks.  These blocks were later used in 2005 to form the sculpture "Swell".  The blocks themselves now rest at the Pedvāle Open Air Art Museum, where they have been used in other patriotic works and displays.

Sculptures
In February 2016, a design by Feldbergs was announced as the provisional winner of a contest for a monument in Daugavpils to commemorate the centenary of Latvian independence in 2018.

National Honors
In 2009 he was awarded the Order of the Three Stars.

References 

1947 births
Living people
Artists from Riga
Latvian sculptors
20th-century Latvian artists
21st-century Latvian artists